Valentina Carretta (born 16 September 1989) is an Italian racing cyclist. She competed in the 2013 UCI women's team time trial in Florence.

See also
2014 Alé Cipollini season

References

External links

1989 births
Living people
Italian female cyclists
Cyclists from Varese